Trent Williams (born July 19, 1988) is an American football offensive tackle for the San Francisco 49ers of the National Football League (NFL). He played college football at Oklahoma, where he was recognized as an All-American, and was drafted by the Washington Redskins fourth overall in the 2010 NFL Draft. Williams is considered one of the best tackles in the league, having made ten Pro Bowls and three All-Pro teams.

In 2019, Williams held out the entire year with the Redskins due to contractual and personal grievances regarding a cancerous growth on his head downplayed by the team but later determined by private doctors to be life threatening. The standoff eventually led to him being traded to the 49ers in 2020.

Early years
Born and raised in Longview, Texas, Williams attended Longview High School, where he played for the Longview Lobos high school football team and was teammates with Malcolm Kelly, Chris Ivory, and Robert Henson. Williams was a unanimous first-team all-district selection as a senior. Longview entered the 2005 UIL playoffs on a 10–0 season record, but lost 14–13 to Nick Florence's South Garland. He was also on the track team as a shot putter. Considered a three-star recruit by Rivals.com, Williams was listed as the No. 28 offensive guard prospect in the nation. He chose Oklahoma over offers from Louisiana State, Oklahoma State, and Texas A&M.

College career
Williams attended the University of Oklahoma, and played for coach Bob Stoops's Oklahoma Sooners football team from 2006 to 2009. Playing as a true freshman, Williams became the starter at right tackle just before the Missouri game in late October 2006 after Branndon Braxton went down with a broken leg, then started the last six games of the season. Williams played 462 snaps, had 75 knockdowns, and was named to The Sporting News Freshman All-America second-team.

In his sophomore year, Williams saw action in all 14 games and had six starts at right tackle, sharing time with Branndon Braxton. As a junior in 2008, he started all 14 games, the first at left tackle and the remaining 13 at right tackle, and registered 131 knockdowns. He was part of a dominant 2008 Sooners offensive line that included Duke Robinson, Phil Loadholt, and allowed only 11 sacks all season, the third-lowest total of any team in the country. The two teams that finished above them (Air Force and Navy) combined to attempt 231 passes. Oklahoma attempted 476, and—featuring quarterback Sam Bradford and running back DeMarco Murray—became the highest-scoring team in the modern era (702 points).

As the lone holdover from the 2008 offensive line, Williams was listed at No. 2 on Rivals.com′s 2009 preseason offensive tackle power ranking. He was also named to the 2009 Outland Trophy watch list. Despite missing the regular season finale due to injury, Williams led Oklahoma with 102 knockdown blocks and 885 plays, and was named an All-American by the American Football Coaches Association.

Professional career
Williams was considered one of the best offensive tackles available in the 2010 NFL Draft, and drew comparisons to Jammal Brown (who, coincidentally, would also join the Redskins that same offseason via trade). According to NFL.com's Gil Brandt, "Williams will be a first-round pick and can be a long-time starter in the NFL".

Washington Redskins
Williams was drafted fourth overall by the Washington Redskins and agreed to a six-year, 60 million contract on July 30, 2010. In 2011, Williams was made an offensive co-captain along with veteran teammate Santana Moss. In Week 14, Williams and teammate Fred Davis were suspended for four games after failing several drug tests.

Williams suffered a bone bruise in his left foot during the first 2012 preseason game against the Buffalo Bills. Despite this injury, he started in the next two preseason games and was fully healed by the season opener against the New Orleans Saints. By the start of the season, his teammates voted for him again to be the offensive team captain. He suffered a right knee injury early in the Redskins' Week 3 game against the Cincinnati Bengals. After getting an MRI exam the next day, it was reported that Williams had another bone bruise. He was able to play in the next game against the Tampa Bay Buccaneers. Despite playing injured throughout the season, Williams had his best performance in 2012 and was selected for the 2013 Pro Bowl but couldn't participate in the Pro Bowl due to an injury when a night club fight occurred. After the Redskins' wild card playoff loss against the Seattle Seahawks on January 6, 2013, Williams struck Seahawks cornerback Richard Sherman in the face. He was fined $7,875 for the incident.

After the Week 11 game of the 2013 season, Williams accused umpire Roy Ellison of swearing at him during the game with his accusation supported by several of his teammates. Ellison was in turn suspended by the NFL for one game. Despite the Redskins having a bad year as a team, Williams was chosen as the team's only player on the 2014 Pro Bowl team.

During the 2015 offseason, Williams lost nearly 30 pounds, going from a playing weight of roughly 345 to 318. On August 29, 2015, he agreed to a five-year, $66 million contract extension with $43.25 million guaranteed. On November 1, 2016, Williams was suspended four games for violating the NFL's substance abuse policy. Despite missing the games, Williams was named to his fifth straight Pro Bowl, was second-team All-Pro for the first time. Williams started 10 games in 2017 while dealing with a knee injury for most of the season, and was placed on injured reserve on December 22, 2017. Despite the injury, Williams was named to his sixth straight Pro Bowl.

In April 2019, it was reported that Williams had a surgical procedure done to remove a growth from his head that was diagnosed as dermatofibrosarcoma protuberans (DFSP), a type of cancer. The growth was first noticed in 2013, with him claiming that the Redskins medical staff told him it was not serious at the time. He did not report to the team's mandatory mini-camp, and reportedly demanded to be released or traded over how the team's medical staff handled the situation back then. On July 27, 2019, the Redskins placed Williams on the team's reserve list. After the Redskins failed to trade him before the trade deadline, he was reinstated on October 30, 2019. However, Williams failed to pass a physical exam, as he experienced discomfort with his helmet due to his scalp having postsurgical soreness, which resulted in the Redskins placing him on the non-football injury list. In March 2020, he and his agent were granted permission to seek a trade to another team.

On September 1, 2022, Williams was inducted into Washington's Greatest Players list in honor of the franchise's 90th anniversary.

San Francisco 49ers
On April 25, 2020, Williams was traded to the San Francisco 49ers in exchange for a fifth-round pick in the 2020 NFL Draft and a third-round pick in the 2021 NFL Draft. The trade reunited Williams with San Francisco 49ers’ head coach Kyle Shanahan, who previously held an offensive coordinator position with the Washington Redskins. Williams was placed on the reserve/COVID-19 list by the team on November 4, 2020, and activated two days later. He was placed back on the COVID-19 list on November 20, and activated again on November 28. On January 1, 2021, Williams was placed on injured reserve after suffering an elbow injury against the Arizona Cardinals in the previous week. Williams was elected to his eighth Pro Bowl after posting a 91.9 PFF grade, which ranked first at his position in 2020.

On March 23, 2021, Williams signed a six-year, $138.06 million contract extension with the 49ers, making him the highest-paid offensive lineman in the NFL. His contract includes $55.10 million guaranteed and a signing bonus of $30.10 million.

On January 29, 2023, Williams was ejected during the NFC Championship for violently slamming Philadelphia Eagles safety K'Von Wallace after a scuffle between both teams. Wallace was ejected as well.

Personal life
Williams is friends with running back Adrian Peterson. The two were teammates at the University of Oklahoma in 2006 and for the Redskins in the late 2010s. Williams and Peterson also co-own a gym in Houston.

Williams' nickname is "Silverback", named after the male gorilla. Williams has a large gorilla tattoo on his back and owns gorilla art and an expensive bejeweled gorilla keychain. At the 2010 NFL Draft, he was introduced by league commissioner Roger Goodell with the moniker, after Williams dared Goodell to do it.

Williams is the subject of a documentary called Silverback, which debuted in December 2021 and covered his comeback from a life-threatening sarcoma on his scalp.

References

External links

San Francisco 49ers roster
Oklahoma Sooners bio

1988 births
Living people
All-American college football players
American football offensive tackles
Longview High School alumni
National Conference Pro Bowl players
Oklahoma Sooners football players
People from Longview, Texas
Players of American football from Texas
San Francisco 49ers players
Unconferenced Pro Bowl players
Washington Redskins players